The 1918–19 Montreal Canadiens season was the team's tenth season and second as a member of the new National Hockey League (NHL). The Canadiens would win the NHL title and go to Seattle to face off for the Stanley Cup. However, a Spanish flu epidemic broke out in Seattle and both teams would abandon the series after several Canadiens fell ill. Montreal defenceman Joe Hall would die from the flu.

Team business
Prior to the season, another attempt was made by Eddie Livingstone to revive the National Hockey Association. Livingstone did not wish to sell his team for less than $20,000, more than the Arena Company was willing to pay. On September 20, 1918, the NHA owners, including the Canadiens, voted to permanently suspend the NHA. Livingstone forced another meeting on December 11, 1918, hoping to get Canadiens' minority shareholder Brunswick to vote with him, but at the meeting, Brunswick officials affirmed their loyalty to the Canadiens and the meeting ended with the Canadiens, Brunswick, Ottawa and Wanderers simply leaving the meeting.

Regular season
Georges Vezina came second in the league in goals against average of 4.3 per game. Odie Cleghorn returned to professional play and he had an outstanding 24 goals in 17 games to lead the league in goals for the Canadiens.

The Toronto Arenas folded on March 20, 1919, leaving only Montreal and Ottawa in the league. The teams proceeded to play off for the league title.

Final standings

Record vs. opponents

Schedule and results

Playoffs
They went against Ottawa for the championship and won it 13 goals to 7, or 13–7.

Finals

Montreal Canadiens vs. Seattle Metropolitans

Series ended 2–2–1 and no winner awarded – playoffs were curtailed due to the influenza epidemic

Player statistics

Skaters
Note: GP = Games played, G = Goals, A = Assists, Pts = Points, PIM = Penalties in minutes

Goaltenders
Note: GP = Games played; TOI = Time on ice (minutes); W = Wins; L = Losses; T = Ties; GA = Goals against; SO = Shutouts; GAA = Goals against average

Awards and records
 NHL champions (O'Brien Cup not awarded)

Transactions
traded  Tommy Smith to Ottawa for cash, November 28, 1918
signed Odie Cleghorn as a free agent, December 9, 1918
signed Fred Doherty as a free agent, December 13, 1918
signed Amos Arbour as a free agent, January 23, 1919

References

See also
 1918–19 NHL season
 List of Stanley Cup champions

Montreal Canadiens seasons
Montreal Canadiens season, 1918-19
Mont